Terragni is a surname. Notable people with the surname include:

 Attilio Terragni, a member of the rightist Monarchist National Party
 Dino Terragni,  an Italian entrepreneur and inventor
 Giuseppe Terragni, an Italian architect 
 Marco Terragni,  an Italian entrepreneur and inventor

See also 

 Terrani

surnames